During the Vashon Glaciation a series of lakes formed along the southern margin of the Cordilleran Ice Cap. In the Hood Canal depression, two significant lake stages existed, Lake Skokomish and Lake Hood. As the glacier receded northward, this freshwater lake grew in size, until the ice was north of the Clifton channel. This longer and lower level lake is referred to as Lake Hood. The glacier continued to recede northward until it reached the Poulsbo channel. Here, the water level equalized to Glacial Lake Russell nolonger having a separate identify.

Lake Skokomish
Lake Skokomish formed in the depression of the Hood Canal and the Skokomish River. It drained across a southern divide at Shelton, Washington. When this outflow joined Lake Russell, it formed the Shelton Delta. As the glacier receded northward, a lower outlet at Clifton, opened into Lake Russell at Cases Inlet (North Bay) 
Lake Hood
The second and lower stage of this water body formed when the ice was far enough north to open the Clifton outlet.  It continued until the glacier reached the Poulsbo Channel.  Here, Lake Russell and Lake Hood equalized and became one lake.

The Clifton Channel:  The Clifton outlet channel is a definite feature across the divide on which it lies. This lake now drains both to Cases Inlet and Hood Canal. Gravel terraces exist along the channel, and one terrace on the east side continues as a small channel directly eastward to Cases Inlet.

The Brinnon Delta:  The only delta of Vashon age known in the valley of Hood Canal is at the mouth of the Dusewallips River, on the north side of the valley. Its altitude makes it obviously a feature produced subsequent to Lake Hood, whose waters were  higher.

The Poulsbo Channel: The Kitsap County peninsula between Hood Canal and Admiralty Inlet is sufficiently high to have confined Lake Hood as far north as Breidablik, northwest of Dogfish (Liberty) Bay. A meridional trough of the pre-Vashon topography, styled the Poulsbo Valley in this paper (locally called Big Valley), crosses the peninsula here. In the Poulsbo Valley, Lake Hood appears to have found an outlet lower than the Clifton channel, and to have entered Lake Russell at the head of Dogfish (Liberty) Bay. 
The Brinnon Delta is to be correlated with the  level of Lake Russell. The two lakes may be considered as one at this stage, Lake Hood sinking by erosion of the Poulsbo channel to the level of Lake Russell, and becoming an arm of it. If the ice dam causing Lake Russell remained effective during the next few miles of retreat, as there is good reason for believing, Lake Russell levels obtained in Hood Canal with broad connection across the low northern tip of Kitsap County peninsula, a few miles north of the Poulsbo channel.
Lack of Vashon Deltas of Olympic Rivers
The Olympic Mountains have several streams leading into Hood Canal, which have no valley deltas at the levels of the glacial lakes. The valley of Quilcene River has a long gravel slope gradually descending from levels above Lake Russell to tidewater.
The Duckabush Valley, the Hama Hama and Skokomish rivers show no evidence of glacially derived deltas. It appears the later erosion regraded the Pleistocene gravels of these valleys.

Lake Hood 
The second and lower stage of this water body formed when the ice was far enough north to open the Clifton outlet. It continued until the glacier reached the Poulsbo Channel. Here, Lake Russell and Lake Hood equalized and became one lake.

See also
Glacial Lake Russell

References

Skokomish
Skokomish
Pierce County, Washington
King County, Washington
Thurston County, Washington
Geography of Washington (state)
Skokomish